Kiss EP is a 1989 EP by The Orb released on WAU/Mr. Modo Records on vinyl only.

Track listing
Side one – Roof
"Kiss Your Love" – 4:28
"Kiss Your Love" (Suck My Kiss Mix) – 4:23

Side two – Floor
"The Roof Is on Fire" – 3:46
"Kiss Your Love" (Ambiorix Mix) – 4:43

External links

98.7 Kiss FM

The Orb albums
1989 debut EPs
Albums produced by Jimmy Cauty